Dendropyrochronology is the science of using tree-ring dating to study and reconstruct the history of wild fires. It is a subfield of dendrochronology, along with dendroclimatology and dendroarchaeology.

See also 

 Dendroclimatology
 Dendroarchaeology

References 

Dendrology